Like a Dancer is a name of the twelfth single by The Enemy and is 3rd from the album Streets in the Sky. It was released on 16 July 2012 and charted No. 9 in UK Albums Chart. A music video for Like a Dancer was published on YouTube. 

Like a Dancer was recorded at Kore Studios, and was published by EMI Music Publishing.  It is licensed to Cooking Vinyl

References

2012 singles
2012 songs
The Enemy (UK rock band) songs
Cooking Vinyl singles